Volodymyr Hryhorovych Veremeyev (born 8 November 1948) is a former Soviet and Ukrainian footballer. He spent all of his playing career in Ukraine.

Career
During his career he played almost exclusively for FC Dynamo Kyiv and won the Soviet Top League in 1968, 1971, 1974, 1975, 1977, 1980 and 1981.vise championship 1969, 1972, 1973, 1976, 1978, 1982.

Statistics for Dynamo 

The statistics in USSR Cups and Europe is made under the scheme "autumn-spring" and enlisted in a year of start of tournaments

References

External links
Profile

1948 births
Living people
People from Primorsky Krai
Russian emigrants to Ukraine
Soviet footballers
Soviet Union international footballers
Ukrainian footballers
Soviet Top League players
FC Dynamo Kyiv players
Footballers at the 1976 Summer Olympics
Olympic footballers of the Soviet Union
Olympic bronze medalists for the Soviet Union
Olympic medalists in football
Medalists at the 1976 Summer Olympics
Association football midfielders
Sportspeople from Primorsky Krai